Wein means grape, vine, wine in German and Yiddish (װײַנ).

According to Nelly Weiss, Wein- style family names originated from signboards (house sign, house shield) in Jewish communities. Wein may also be related the German verb "weinen" (to cry).

Notable people with the surname include:

 Albert Wein, American sculptor
 Berel Wein, Orthodox rabbi
 Desiderius Wein (1873–1944), Hungarian doctor and gymnast
 Elizabeth E. Wein,  American author residing in Scotland
 George Wein, jazz pianist
 Glynis Wein, colorist in the comics industry, first wife of Len 
 Len Wein (1948–2017), American comic book writer

See also
 Der Wein, 1929 concert aria by Alban Berg
 
 
 Wain
 Wine
 Vine

References